State awards of the Azerbaijani Republic include the orders, decorations, and medals.

The following is a list of these awards of Azerbaijan.

Orders

Medals

See also
 Armed Forces of the Azerbaijani Republic

References